Benzinger is a German language habitational surname for someone from Benzingen in Württemberg. Notable people with the name include:
 Franjo Benzinger (1899–1991), Croatian pharmacist
 Todd Benzinger (1963), American former professional baseball first baseman and outfielder

German-language surnames
German toponymic surnames